Paul de Lange (born 4 February 1981 in Beverwijk) is a Dutch footballer who currently plays as a midfielder for Katwijk in the Dutch Tweede Divisie.

Career
De Lange started his career as a youth soccer player at local amateur club R.K. v.v. DEM Beverwijk, before making the move to the youth department of Telstar. He made his debut in professional football at age 19, on 19 August 2000 in the Eerste Divisie match against Excelsior, coming on as a 90th-minute substitute for Melvin Holwijn. The match ended in a 3–1 win for the White Lions. He was signed by SC Heerenveen in the summer of 2003, making his Eredivisie-debut on 17 August 2003, the opening day of the 2003–04 Eredivisie season, in a 0–1 away victory against FC Volendam. De Lange made a further 27 league appearances in the 2003–04 season, then joined RBC Roosendaal the following season. After three years in Roosendaal, he was picked up by Superleague Greece club Veria. After 15 appearances for the Greek side, he was picked up by newly promoted Eredivisie side FC Volendam in May 2008 making 31 league appearances and scoring 5 goals in that season.

In January 2011, De Lange went to Almere City on loan for the rest of the season.

References

External links
 Paul de Lange profile on VI.nl 

1981 births
Living people
Dutch footballers
SC Telstar players
SC Heerenveen players
RBC Roosendaal players
Veria F.C. players
FC Volendam players
Almere City FC players
Eredivisie players
Eerste Divisie players
Derde Divisie players
Super League Greece players
Sportspeople from Beverwijk
Expatriate footballers in Greece
Dutch expatriate footballers
Dutch expatriate sportspeople in Greece
VV Katwijk players
Association football forwards
Footballers from North Holland